Botirali Ergashev (Uzbek Cyrillic: Ботирали Эргашев; born 23 June 1995) is an Uzbekistani footballer who plays for FK Kokand 1912 and Uzbekistan national football team.

International career
Ergashev made his debut for the Uzbekistan national football team in a 1-0 friendly loss to Iran on 19 May 2019.

References

External links

1995 births
Living people
People from Namangan Region
Uzbekistani footballers
Uzbekistan international footballers
Uzbekistan youth international footballers
Association football goalkeepers
Uzbekistan Super League players
Pakhtakor Tashkent FK players
Navbahor Namangan players
Asian Games competitors for Uzbekistan